Léto s kovbojem, Summer With a Cowboy in English, is a 1976 Czechoslovak film directed by Ivo Novák. It starred Daniela Kolářová, Jaromír Hanzlík and Oldřich Vízner.

Casting 
 Daniela Kolářová — Doubravka
 Jaromír Hanzlík — Honza
 Oldřich Vízner — Boba
 Jiří Pleskot — Father
 Libuše Švormová — Mother
 Dana Medřická — Doubravka's grandmother
 Marie Rosůlková — Great-grandmother

References

External links

1976 films
Czechoslovak romantic comedy films
Czech romantic comedy films
Films scored by Petr Hapka
1970s Czech films